Ramcha (also Romanized as Ramchā; also known as Ramchāh and Rameh Chāh) is a village in Howmeh Rural District, in the Central District of Qeshm County, Hormozgan Province, Iran. At the 2006 census, its population was 3,004, in 568 families.

References 

Populated places in Qeshm County